Shimose may refer to:
11492 Shimose (1988 VR3), a main-belt asteroid
Shimose powder or shimosite, a type of explosive shell filling, and a form of picric acid
Pedro Shimose A Japanese-Bolivian poet and author.